KWND (88.3 FM, "The Wind") is a radio station broadcasting in Springfield, Missouri, United States, with a contemporary Christian music format. KWND is owned/operated by the not-for-profit Radio Training Network, which also operates stations in Missouri, North Carolina, South Carolina, Georgia, Alabama, and Florida.

History
KWND began broadcasting on July 12, 1993 from its studios at 2550 S. Campbell Avenue in Springfield, Missouri. Originally owned by Parkcrest Assembly of God, the station was purchased in 1995 by the Radio Training Network.

KWND began broadcasting in HD radio on January 28, 2020, on 88.3-1 FM. LF Radio was added to 88.3-2 FM on February 3, 2020.

Translators
KWND programming is also broadcast on the following repeater/translator/booster stations:
 KCKJ, 89.5-FM in Sarcoxie, MO, since 2018
 K265DR, 100.9-FM in Bolivar, MO, since 2004
 K277AM, 103.3-FM between Mansfield, MO and Ava, MO, since 2007
 K271CC, 102.1-FM in Mountain Grove, MO, since 2016

Industry
KWND is a monitored reporting station to the Christian AC charts of Billboard magazine.

External links
 The Wind KWND official website

WND
Contemporary Christian radio stations in the United States
WND
Radio stations established in 1993